Boneh-ye Bad (also Romanized as Boneh-ye Bād; also known as Banehābād and Bonehābād) is a village in Fathabad Rural District, in the Central District of Baft County, Kerman Province, Iran. At the 2006 census, its population was 99, in 25 families.

References 

Populated places in Baft County